Brahim Dargouthi, or Darghouthi (in Arabic ابراهيم درغوثي), (Tozeur, 21 December 1955) is a Tunisian, author of short stories and novels. A graduate of the Ecole Normale of teachers of Tunis in 1975, he taught in various schools and is the director of a primary school in Moularés Gafsa in 2013. He is also a member of the steering committee of the Union of Tunisian Writers (Ittiḥād al-kuttāb al-tūnisiyyīna) and leads its industry Gafsa. Dargouthi is 460th in Arabian Business ranking of the 500 most influential Arabs.

Short stories 

  al-Nakhl yamūtu wāqifan (Palm trees die erect), Publishing Samed, Sfax, 1989
  al-Khubz al-murr (Bitter bread), Publishing Samed, Sfax, 1990
  Rajul muḥtaram jiddan (A very respectful man), Publishing Samed Sahar, Tunis, 1995
  Kaʿsuka yā maṭar (To your health, rain), Tunis: Sahr editions 1997  
  Manāzil al-kalām (Houses of talks),Tunis: ichrak editions, 2009 
  Good night: anthology of short stories, cultural publishing and distribution ( Monastir 2012)

Novels 
  al-Darāwīsh yaʾūdūna ilā al-manfā (Dervishes return to banned lands)), first ed., London: Riadh Arraies editions, 1992; second ed., Tunis: Sahr editions, 1998; third ed., Tunis: The Mediterranean editions, 2006.  
  al-Qiyāma… al-āna (And now... Resurrection), first ed. Syrya: Alhiwar editions, 1994; second ed., Tunis : sahar editions, 1999.  
  Shabābīk muntaṣaf al-layl (Midnight windows),first ed., Tunis: sahar editions, 1996; second ed. Sousse : Almaarif editions, 2008.  
  Asrār ṣāḥib al-sitr (The secrets of the Jackets owner), first ed., Sfax: samed editions, 1998; second ed., on author's own expenses, 2009.  
  Warāʿ as-sarāb... qalīlan (A little behind the Mirage), first ed., Sliana: Alathaf editions, 2002; second ed. Egypt : Center for Arab civilization.
  The facts of what happened to a woman with golden clog, Tunisian house editing / tunis 2012

References

Tunisian novelists
Living people
Year of birth missing (living people)